Skenea olgae is a species of minute sea snail, a marine gastropod mollusk in the family Skeneidae.

Description
The size of the shell varies between 0.7 mm and 1.1 mm.

Distribution
This species occurs in the Atlantic Ocean off Madeira.

References

 Segers W., Swinnen F. & De Prins R., 2009. Marine Molluscs of Madeira. Snoeck Publishers, Heule, Belgium, 612 p.

External links
 

olgae
Gastropods described in 2009